The Big Bad Rock Guitar of Glen Campbell is the fourth album by American singer-guitarist Glen Campbell, released in 1965 by Capitol Records.  A vocal chorus appears on many tracks, singing wordless melody lines; otherwise, the album is entirely instrumental.

Track listing
Side 1 
 "Walk, Don't Run" (Johnny Smith, Dottie Faye) – 1:54
 "Ticket to Ride" (John Lennon, Paul McCartney) – 2:18
 "Steve's Shuck" (Steven D. Kreisman) – 2:42
 "Spanish Shades" (Glen Campbell) – 2:34
 "The Lone Arranger" (Billy Strange) – 2:07
 "The James Bond Theme" (Monty Norman) – 2:17
 
Side 2 
 "It's Not Unusual" (Gordon Mills, Les Reed) – 2:11
 "King of the Road" (Roger Miller) – 2:12
 "Sassy" (Bill Pitman, Billy Strange) – 2:08
 "Mr. Tambourine Man" (Bob Dylan) – 2:46
 "Spring Mist" (Glen Campbell) – 2:13
 "Beef Jerky" (Steven D. Kreisman) – 2:35

Personnel
Music
 Glen Campbell – electric guitar

Production
 Steve Douglas – producer
 Billy Strange – arranger, conductor
 Joe Polito – engineer

References

Glen Campbell albums
1965 albums
Capitol Records albums
Albums conducted by Billy Strange
Albums arranged by Billy Strange
Albums recorded at Capitol Studios